is a Japanese storyboard artist and director of television, OVA, and anime films. He previously worked under 橋本 光夫 (pronounced the same), but changed as someone else was using that name. While he was under contract with Toei Animation, he also did work for other companies under the name .

Hashimoto is known for his work on series such as the Dr. Slump & Arale-chan TV and film series, all three Dragon Ball TV series, as well as several of the Dragon Ball features. In recent years, he has worked as a director on mostly independent (or "hobby") anime works.

Works

Anime television series
Credits are for director unless otherwise indicated.

Dr. Slump & Arale-chan (1981-1986, assistant director)
Dragon Ball (1986-1989, assistant director)
Dragon Ball Z (1989-1996, director, OP/ED credits director)
Dragon Ball GT (1996-1997)
Ninku (1995-1996, storyboards, director (as Tachibana))
Midori no Makibaō (1996-1997, storyboards, director (as Tachibana))
Kindaichi Case Files (1997-2000)
Flame of Recca (1997-1998, storyboards, director (as Tachibana))
Hanitarō Desu. (1997-1998)
Haruniwake no Saninme (1998)
Heritako Pū-chan (1998-1999, chief director)
Silent Möbius (1998, storyboards (as Tachibana))
Master Keaton (1998-1999 (as Tachibana))
Dokkiri Doctor (1998-1999 storyboards (as Tachibana))
Kamikaze Kaito Jeanne (1999-2000)
D4 Princess (1999, storyboards, director (as Tachibana))
Bubu Chacha (1999, storyboards (as Tachibana))
We Know You, Moonlight Mask-kun! (1999-2000, storyboards (as Tachibana))
Shinzo (2000, director, OP credits director)
Herohero-kun (2000-2001 (as Tachibana))
Shin Megami Tensei: Devil Children (2000-2001, storyboards, director (as Tachibana))
Pipo Papo Patrol-kun (2000-2001, chief director)
I Love Bubu Chacha (2001, storyboards, director (as Tachibana))
Panyo Panyo Di Gi Charat (2002, storyboards, director)
Beyblade (2002-2003, storyboards, director)
Galaxy Angel Z (2002)
Chobits (2002)
Tsuribaka Nisshi (2002-2003)
Weiß Kreuz Glühen (2002-2003, storyboards, director)
Galaxy Angel A (2002-2003, storyboards, director)
Battle B-Daman (2004-2005)
Crash B-Daman (2006, storyboards)
Kirarin Revolution (2006-2007, storyboards, director)
Bakugan Battle Brawlers (2007-2012)
Scan2Go (2010-2011)
Initial D Fifth Stage (2012-2013)
Initial D Final Stage (2014)
Omakase! Miracle Cat-dan (2015-2016)
Kamiwaza Wanda (2016)
Yōkai Apāto no Yūga na Nichijō (2017)

OVA
Credits are for director unless otherwise indicated.

Dragon Ball: Goku's Traffic Safety (1988, director)
Chameleon (manga) (1992-1996, episodes 1-2)
TwinBee: Winbee no ⅛ Panic (1994)

Anime films
Credits are for director unless otherwise indicated.

Dragon Ball: Curse of the Blood Rubies (1986, assistant director)
Dragon Ball: Sleeping Princess in Devil's Castle (1987, assistant director)
Dragon Ball Z: The Tree of Might (1990, storyboards)
Dragon Ball Z: Bardock – The Father of Goku (1990, TV Special)
Dragon Ball Z: Lord Slug (1991)
Dragon Ball Z: Cooler's Revenge (1991)
Dr. Slump and Arale-chan: N-cha! From Penguin Village with Love (1993)
Dr. Slump and Arale-chan: Hoyoyo!! Follow the Rescued Shark... (1994)
Dr. Slump and Arale-chan: N-cha!! Excited Heart of Summer Vacation (1994)
Dragon Ball Z: Wrath of the Dragon (1995)
Tamagotchi: Honto no Hanashi (1997)

References

External links
 Vida de Loca (official site)

Japanese television directors
Living people
Year of birth missing (living people)
Anime directors
Japanese storyboard artists
Place of birth missing (living people)